The Legend of Oasis, released as The Story of Thor 2 in Europe and as  in Japan, is a 1996 action role-playing game developed by Ancient and published by Sega for the Sega Saturn. It is the successor and prequel to the 1994 title Beyond Oasis for the Sega Mega Drive/Genesis. The player takes the role of Leon, who must find the six elemental spirits and use their powers to fight the evil wizard Agito and his legions of creatures.

The game was first announced under the title "Legend of Thor". It was originally planned for the 32X add-on shortly after the release of its predecessor; however, the idea was scrapped before the game's development, according to an official statement and documents from Ancient.

Plot 
Many years before the events in Beyond Oasis, the warrior Ordan gives his young pupil Leon the Golden Armlet, so that he can become the Spirit King of Oasis. This can only be achieved by obtaining the loyalty of the six elemental spirits of the land, which are called Dytto (the spirit of water), Efreet (the spirit of fire), Bawu (the spirit of earth), Brass (the spirit of sound), Shade (the spirit of darkness), and Airl (the spirit of air). Leon's nemesis is the evil wizard Agito who has the Silver Armlet and threatens to destroy the land.

Gameplay 

The game action takes place in real time. Each weapon comes with a set of special attacks that are executed in fighting game style. The player can also summon spirits by firing a "Spirit Ball" at some object from the blue gem in his armlet; the exact spirit summoned depends on the object hit. The spirits can fight enemies, heal Leon, or help solve puzzles. Each has a different power, and Leon can wield short and long swords as well as bow and arrow. He is able to perform "combos" by means of combinations of the D-pad and the action buttons. His arrows can trigger switches.

The game is generally one-player, though a two-player mode can be accessed using a cheat code.

As with the original, the soundtrack was composed by Yuzo Koshiro.

Reception

The Legend of Oasis received mostly positive reviews. Critics varied widely in their reasons for recommending the game, but the most common subjects of praise were the sharp graphics, controls, and blending of the action, puzzle, and RPG genres. The most common criticism was that it is too difficult to judge the difference in height between different platforms, though of the critics who had a more mixed response to the game, Electronic Gaming Monthlys Dan Hsu said his chief complaint was that the puzzles are too difficult, and GameSpots Jeff Gerstmann said the game is enjoyable but not original enough (compared to its predecessor, Beyond Oasis) to justify its appearance on the Saturn platform. GamePros Scary Larry remarked that "Though somewhat juvenile, this smooth-moving and colorful action RPG is engaging and enjoyable." Rad Automatic of Sega Saturn Magazine found the game's longevity to be its strongest point, concluding that "It can't be said that Thor is an essential purchase, as it's currently overshadowed by a few corking bona fide classics, but if you like to see value-for-money from your games, Thor is definitely a title you should check out." Next Generation held that it "manages to expand upon the original formula cosmetically while still offering all the great action-adventure elements that made the first game a winner."

Notes

References

External links 
 The Legend of Oasis at Giant Bomb
 The Legend of Oasis at MobyGames

1996 video games
Action role-playing video games
Cancelled Sega 32X games
Fantasy video games
Role-playing video games
Sega video games
Sega Saturn games
Sega Saturn-only games
Single-player video games
Video games based on Arabian mythology
Video games scored by Yuzo Koshiro
Video games developed in Japan
Ancient (company) games